Renee Holmes (born 21 December 1999) is a New Zealand rugby union player. She plays for Matatū in the Super Rugby Aupiki competition and for Waikato provincially. She also plays for the Black Ferns internationally and was a member of their 2021 Rugby World Cup champion squad.

Background 
Holmes has represented New Zealand at age-grade level in taekwondo, soccer and ultimate frisbee.

Rugby career

2020–21 
Holmes made her Black Ferns debut on 21 November 2020 against the New Zealand Barbarians at Nelson. She made her international debut on 31 October 2021 against England at Exeter, it was the Black Ferns 100th test match. In 2021, she signed on with Matatū for Super Rugby Aupiki's 2022 inaugural season.

2022 
Holmes was named in the Black Ferns squad for the 2022 Pacific Four Series. She scored her first international test try against the United States in the Pacific series. She was reselected for the team for the August test series against Australia for the Laurie O'Reilly Cup.

Holmes was selected for the Black Ferns 32-player squad for the delayed 2021 Rugby World Cup in New Zealand. She scored a brace of tries against a scoreless Scotland in New Zealand's final pool game. She also featured in the knockout stage of the tournament and played in the final against England. The Black Ferns were crowned champions for the sixth time.

2023 
Holmes re-signed with Matatū for the 2023 Super Rugby Aupiki season.

References

External links 

 Black Ferns Profile

1999 births
Living people
New Zealand women's international rugby union players
New Zealand female rugby union players